Tatsuo Hirayama is a Japanese diplomat. He was the Japanese ambassador to the Republic of Trinidad and Tobago and other CARICOM countries. Hirayama was appointed on 16 January 2019. He previously served as the Consul General of Japan in Perth, Australia.

On his tenure as the ambassador to T&T and CARICOM, he played a key role in supporting hygiene against the COVID-19 pandemic in this region, such as twenty-three Viral RNA Test Kits for the CARPHA Medical Microbiology Laboratory in Port of Spain and US$267,724 donation for the purchase of kits to conduct approximately 72,090 tests for Guyana, Jamaica and Suriname.

References 

Living people
Ambassadors of Japan
Ambassadors to Trinidad and Tobago
Ambassadors to Antigua and Barbuda
Ambassadors to Dominica
Ambassadors to Grenada
Ambassadors of Japan to Guyana
Ambassadors to Saint Kitts and Nevis
Ambassadors to Saint Lucia
Ambassadors to Saint Vincent and the Grenadines
Ambassadors to Suriname
Japanese diplomats
Year of birth missing (living people)